The Men's 100m breaststroke event at the 2010 South American Games was held on March 26, with the heats at 10:58 and the Final at 18:41.

Medalists

Records

Results

Heats

Final

References
Heats
Final

Breast 100m M